It has been proposed that Australia seek membership of ASEAN, a political and economic union of 10 member states in Southeast Asia. While the Australian Government has never formally applied for membership, Australia maintains a high level of bilateral relations with ASEAN and its member states. 

Australian participates in the East Asia Summit and the ASEAN Regional Forum.

Support
Indonesian President Joko Widodo has publicly expressed his support for Australia to join ASEAN, as has former Australian Prime Minister Paul Keating. 

Due to Australia's large role in Southeast Asia and being geographically situated near Southeast Asia, Graeme Dobell of the Australian Strategic Policy Institute (ASPI), an independent think tank, wrote in 2015 that it was necessary for Australia to join the organisation. In February 2018, the ASPI recommended that Australia and New Zealand join ASEAN by 2024.

Opposition

See also

 Enlargement of ASEAN

References

Foreign relations of Australia
Australia